This is a list of the recipients of the Bangla Academy Literary Award from 2010 to 2019.

2010 
6 persons were awarded.
 Rubi Rahman (poetry)
 Nasir Ahmed (poetry)
 Bulbul Chowdhury (folk literature)
 Khan Sarwar Murshid (essay and research)
 Ajoy Roy (science and technology)
 Shahjahan Kibria (juvenile literature)

2011 
10 persons were awarded.
 Ashim Saha (poetry)
 Kamal Chowdhury (poetry)
 Anisul Hoque (folk literature)
 Abdullah Abu Sayeed (essay)
 Biswajit Ghosh (research)
 Khaliquzzaman Elias (translation)
 Belal Muhammad (literature on liberation war affairs)
 Baren Chakrabarti (travel story)
  (science, technology and environment)
  (juvenile literature)

2012 
9 persons were awarded.
  (poetry)
 Abid Anwar (poetry)
  (folk literature)
 Sanat Kumar Saha (essay)
  (research)
 Fakrul Alam (translation)
  (Liberation War-related writings)
  (science, technology and environment)
 Mahbub Talukdar (juvenile literature)

2013 
11 persons were awarded.
 Helal Hafiz (poetry)
 Purabi Basu (folk literature)
 Mofidul Hoque (essay)
 Jamil Chowdhury (research)
  (research)
 Kaiser Haq (translation)
 Haroon Habib (Liberation War-related writings)
 Mahfuzur Rahman (autobiography and travel story)
 Shahidul Islam (science, technology and environment)
 Kaiser Chowdhury (juvenile literature)
 Aslam Sunny (juvenile literature)

2014 
7 persons were awarded.
 Shihab Sarkar (poetry)
 Zakir Talukder (fiction)
 Shantanu Kaiser (essay)
 Bhuyian Iqbal (research)
 Abu Mohammad Delwar Hossain (literature on liberation war)
 Mainus Sultan (travel story)
 Khaleque bin Zainuddin (juvenile literature)

2015 
11 persons were awarded.
  (poetry)
 Shaheen Akhtar (fiction)
 Abul Momen (essay)
 Atiur Rahman (essay)
 Moniruzzaman (research)
 Abdus Selim (translation)
 Tajul Mohammad (literature on liberation war)
 Faruq Ahmed Choudhury (biography and travel story)
 Masum Reza (drama)
 Sharif Khan (science, technology and environment)
  (juvenile literature)

2016 
7 persons were awarded.
 Abu Hasan Shahriar (poetry)
 Shahaduz Zaman (fiction)
  (essay and research)
 Niaz Zaman (translation)
 MA Hasan (literature on the liberation war)
 Noorjahan Bose (autobiography/memoir)
 Rashed Rouf (juvenile literature)

2017 
12 persons were awarded.
 Mohammad Sadik (poetry)
  (poetry)
  (fiction)
 Mahbubul Haque (essay)
  (research)
   (translation)
 Kamrul Hasan Bhuiyan (literature on liberation war)
 Surma Jahid (literature on liberation war)
 Shakoor Majid (travelogue)
 Malay Bhowmick (drama)
  (science, technology and environment) 
  (juvenile literature)

2018 
4 persons were awarded.

 Afsan Chowdhury (literature on liberation war)
 Quazi Rosy (poetry)
 Mohit Kamal (fiction)
 Syed Mohammad Shahed (essay and research)

2019 
10 persons were awarded.

 Rafiqul Islam (literature on liberation war)
 Makid Haider (poetry)
 Wasi Ahmed (literature)
 Swarochish Sarkar (essay/research)
 Khairul Alam Sabuj (translation)
 Rahim Shah (children's literature)
 Ratan Siddiqui (drama)
 Nadira Majumder (science fiction)
 Faruk Moinuddin (autobiography/travelogue) 
 Saymon Zakaria (folklore)

References

Bengali literary awards
Bangladeshi literary awards
Lists of award winners
Civil awards and decorations of Bangladesh